Alagad is a party-list in the Philippines closely linked with the religious group, Iglesia Ni Cristo which was founded on November 14, 1997, by Diogenes Osabel, an advocate for the urban poor’s rights and welfare. The party was originally constituted by a group of urban poor leaders in the National Capital Region (NCR) led by Elymer de Guzman. Its initial base included the cities of Baguio, Cebu, Davao, Cagayan de Oro, and Zamboanga City, and the provinces of Pangasinan, Pampanga, Tarlac, Bulacan, and Cavite.

"Alagad" means "Disciple" or "Follower" in the Filipino language.

The Commission on Elections cancelled the registration of Alagad as a partylist organization in 2021 for failing to participate in the last two elections.

Electoral performance

References

External links
 Alagad's official website

Party-lists represented in the House of Representatives of the Philippines
Iglesia ni Cristo
Political parties established in 1997
1997 establishments in the Philippines